DU Crucis is a red supergiant and slow irregular variable star in the open cluster NGC 4755, which is also known as the Kappa (κ) Crucis Cluster or Jewel Box Cluster.

Location

DU Crucis is one of the brighter members of the Jewel Box Cluster and the brightest red supergiant, strongly contrasting with the other bright members which are blue supergiants. It is part of the central bar of the prominent letter "A"-shaped asterism at the centre of the cluster.  The cluster is part of the larger Centaurus OB1 association and lies about 8,500 light years away.

The cluster is just to the south-east of β Crucis, the lefthand star of the Southern Cross.

Properties
DU Crucis is an M2 intermediate luminosity supergiant (luminosity class Iab). Despite its low temperature, it is 46,600 times the luminosity of the sun, due to its very large size.  The κ Crucis cluster has a calculated age of 11.2 million years.

Variability

Photometry from the Hipparcos satellite mission showed that DU Crucis varies in brightness with an amplitude of 0.44 magnitudes.  No periodicity could be detected in the variations and it was classified as a slow irregular variable of type Lc, indicating a supergiant.

References

External links
 

Crux (constellation)
M-type supergiants
062918
CD-59 4459
J12534132-6020578
Slow irregular variables
IRAS catalogue objects
Crucis, DU